Godwin Osagie Abbe (born 10 January 1949) in Benin City, Edo State, Nigeria is a retired Nigerian Army Major General and former Defence Minister of Nigeria from 2009 to 2010. He served as the Nigerian Minister of Interior from 2007 to 2009.

Military career

Godwin Abbe joined the military in 1967 as a private, was commissioned second lieutenant in July 1968, and was promoted Colonel in 1986. He served during the Nigerian Civil War. 
He earned a Postgraduate Diploma in International Relations from Obafemi Awolowo University (OAU), Ile-Ife. 
He is also a graduate of the United States Army Infantry School Fort Benning, Georgia, Ghana Armed Forces Staff College and the National Institute for Policy and Strategic studies, Kuru.

He was military governor of Akwa Ibom State 1988-1990) and Rivers State (1990–1991). 
He then became General Officer Commanding (GOC) 2 Division Nigerian Army; Commander, Training and Doctrine Command (TRADOC) and Commander, National War College. He retired in 1999 with the rank of Major General.

Politician
After leaving the army, Godwin Abbe joined People's Democratic Party in 1999, and became chairman of the party in Edo State.

Minister of Interior

President Umaru Yar'Adua appointed Godwin Abbe as the Nigerian Minister of Interior on 26 July 2007. 
At a meeting of Commonwealth Heads of Government in Kampala, Uganda in November 2007, Abbe met British Prime Minister Gordon Brown and asked for assistance in restructuring the police force, which was suffering from low morale due to poor welfare, inadequate training and lack of vital work tools.

As minister of the interior, Godwin Abbe was chairman of a committee that recommended an amnesty programme for gunmen in the Niger Delta, an important step towards improving output of oil and gas.
Soon after, he was appointed Minister of Defense, a key role in implementing the amnesty.

Minister of Defense

In September 2009, Abbe said that the Amnesty would not prevent security operatives from going after illegal oil bunkerers, who he said would be treated as enemies of the state.
In October 2009, speak of Niger Delta militants who had accepted the government amnesty, Abbe gave assurances they would be rehabilitated, re-integrated and helped in every way possible to make them self-sustaining in life.

References 

1949 births
Defence ministers of Nigeria
Interior ministers of Nigeria
Living people
Nigerian military governors of Akwa Ibom State
Nigerian military governors of Rivers State
Peoples Democratic Party (Nigeria) politicians
Nigerian Army officers
Nigerian generals
State political party chairs of Nigeria
People from Benin City